Fufius lucasae is a spider in the family Cyrtaucheniidae, native to Brazil. It was first described in 2004 by Guadanucci and Indicatti. The specific name lucasae honours Sylvia M. Lucas.

References

Cyrtaucheniidae
Spiders of Brazil
Spiders described in 2004